The 1958–59 Scottish Second Division was won by Ayr United who, along with second placed Arbroath, were promoted to the First Division. Montrose finished bottom.

Table

References 

 Scottish Football Archive

Scottish Division Two seasons
2
Scot